Player versus environment or player versus enemy (PvE, also known as player versus monster (PvM)), is a term used for both single player and online games, particularly MMORPGs, CORPGs, MUDs, other online role-playing video games and survival games to refer to fighting computer-controlled enemies—in contrast to PvP (player versus player). In survival games a large part may be fighting the elements, controlling hunger and thirst, learning to adapt to the environment and exploration.

Usually a PvE mode can be played alone, with human companions or with AI companions. The PvE mode may contain a storyline that is narrated as the player progresses through missions. It may also contain missions that may be done in any order.

Examples
Guild Wars narrates its story by displaying in-game cut scenes and dialogue with non-playable characters (NPCs). To enhance replayability, missions can often be completed many times. Characters playing in this mode are often protected against being killed by other players and/or having their possessions stolen. An example of a game where this is not the case is Eve Online, where players can be, and often are, ambushed by other human players player versus player while attempting to complete a quest.
Some games, such as World of Warcraft, offer the player the choice of participating in open-world PvP combat or doing quests without PvP interruption through use of specialty servers and temporary player flags.

See also
 Player versus player
 Cooperative gameplay
 Deathmatch
 Single player video game

References

MUD terminology
Role-playing game terminology
Video game gameplay
Video game terminology